Carbohydrate sulfotransferase 7 is an enzyme that in humans is encoded by the CHST7 gene.

Function 

This gene belongs to the sulfotransferase gene family. Sulfotransferases generate sulfated glycosaminoglycan (GAG) moieties during chondroitin sulfate biosynthesis. They create considerable structural diversity among chondroitin sulfates by transferring sulfate with remarkable specificity for the underlying oligosaccharide substrate. This gene product mainly transfers sulfate to N-acetylgalactosamine. The regulated expression of each member of this gene family may be an important determinant of sulfated GAGs expression and the associated function of chondroitin sulfates as regulators of many biologic processes. This gene is part of a gene cluster on chromosome Xp11.23.

References

External links

Further reading